Stephany Folsom is a screenwriter best known for her work on Toy Story 4 and Paper Girls.

Biography

Early life
Folsom was raised in Colorado Springs, Colorado. There, she developed an interest in filmmaking. She told her high school counselor that she wanted to enroll in film school, but was advised instead to study radio. After graduating from high school, Folsom moved to Los Angeles, California and enrolled in film school at Loyola Marymount University. After graduating from Loyola, Folsom worked as a film development intern providing script coverage and notes. 

She left the position to focus on her personal writing, but soon left Los Angeles to assist a friend in filming a documentary short to support an AIDS clinic in India. Complications arose, in which Folsom later explained, "The clinic was never going to be built. It was near the Golden Triangle so there were all kinds of problems with drug trafficking. I didn't know any of this was going on there before I went ... We ended up being in lockdown and under curfew." The project was never completed; nevertheless, Folsom later worked with various foundations to produce documentary shorts about human trafficking and AIDS. Meanwhile, she wrote for the YouTube series Ds2dio 360, while writing feature spec scripts. After a few years, Folsom recalled feeling "completely burnt out on the travel and tough subject matter."

Career
Back in the United States, Folsom attended a NASA Social event and later toured a Stanley Kubrick exhibit at the Los Angeles County Museum of Art. There, she was reminded of the conspiracy theory that Stanley Kubrick had faked the Apollo 11 moon landing. Inspired by the idea, she began writing 1969: A Space Odyssey in January 2013. That same year, her script was listed at number 56 on the 2013 Hit List, Launchpad's list of the best spec scripts of the year. It was also listed on the 2013 Black List. A year later, 1969: A Space Odyssey was given a live reading at the first Black List Live! event as part of the LA Film Festival. The reading featured Jared Harris as Stanley Kubrick and Kathryn Hahn as Barbara, a NASA employee. 

In May 2015, Folsom was hired to write The Princess of North Sudan. The project was based on the real-life story of Jeremiah Heaton, a man who claimed a piece of land between Egypt and Sudan to make his daughter a princess. The film has yet to be released. 

In December 2015, Folsom was hired to polish the script for Thor: Ragnarok. Before the film's release, Folsom was denied a writing credit on the film by the Writers Guild of America. Folsom publicly lambasted the decision on Twitter, writing "Marvel gave me 'story by' credit on THOR RAGNAROK and the writers' guild denied me the credit due to guild regulations." Folsom was later hired to write two episodes ("The High Tower" and "Secrets and Holograms") for Star Wars Resistance. Folsom was the first female writer to work on the series. 

In January 2018, Folsom was hired to write a new screenplay for Toy Story 4 with Andrew Stanton. The screenplay was a finalist for the 45th annual Humanitas Prize in the Family Feature Film Category. In November 2018, it was announced that Folsom would write the screenplay for This is Jane, a film adaptation of The Story of Jane: The Legendary Underground Feminist Abortion Service by Laura Kaplan. The project was set to star Michelle Williams.

In November 2019, Folsom was hired as a consulting producer on Amazon Studios' The Lord of the Rings: The Rings of Power, for which she also wrote the first two episodes. Earlier that year, Folsom was hired to write for the television adaptation of Brian K. Vaughan's comic book series, Paper Girls. However, in July 2021, Folsom officially departed her position as co-showrunner and would no longer be involved with the series.

In August 2022, Folsom was hired to write an upcoming television adaptation of King Kong for Disney+.

Personal life
Folsom lives in Altadena, California.

Filmography

Film

Television

Awards and nominations

References

External links
  
 Personal website 

21st-century American screenwriters
21st-century American women writers
American women screenwriters
Animation screenwriters
Living people
Loyola Marymount University alumni
Pixar people
Writers from Colorado
Women science fiction and fantasy writers
Year of birth missing (living people)